Miranda Eleanor De Fonbrune Cooper (born 1975) is an English singer, songwriter, record producer, dancer and television presenter. Miranda Cooper has worked in the music industry since 1996 when she gained her first recording contract. She worked as a professional dancer for artists such as Dannii Minogue before going into television presenting.

In 1997, Cooper met Brian Higgins, the founder of Kent-based songwriting and production team Xenomania. Miranda Cooper signed a deal with London Records under the alias Moonbaby, releasing the single "Here We Go" to little success, although it was used as the theme tune to the cartoon series Totally Spies! with some lyrics adjusted. Cooper started songwriting with Higgins, eventually finding commercial success and critical acclaim with their productions for Girls Aloud and Sugababes. Cooper has co-written for successful artists such as Alesha Dixon, Gabriella Cilmi and Kylie Minogue. She operates primarily as a lyricist, rather than a musical composer.

Life and career

1996–2000: dancing, presenting, and recording
Cooper found a passion for dancing and performing when she was nine years old. Cooper worked for as a backing dancer for Gina G, performing with her at the 1996 Eurovision Song Contest. She has also danced for Dannii Minogue and PJ and Duncan. Cooper later stopped dancing and went into television presenting. She gained her first record deal in 1996 as one half of the pop duo T-Shirt, alongside Chloé Treend. The duo signed to Warner Bros. Records, and their cover of Hot Chocolate's "You Sexy Thing" reached number five in New Zealand and number six in Australia.

Cooper was introduced to English record producer Brian Higgins by Saint Etienne members Bob Stanley and Pete Wiggs in the late 1990s. Cooper began recording music with him under the moniker Xenomania. "As soon as he played me some tracks, I thought 'This feels right.'" Thanks to a connection with Pete Tong, Cooper and Higgins were able to sign a deal with London Records. In 2000, Cooper was signed as a solo artist under the alias of Moonbaby. A four-track sampler was released, featuring the songs "Moonbaby", "Here We Go" (later recorded by Lene Nystrøm and Girls Aloud), "Deadlines and Diets" (later recorded by Girls Aloud), and "I'm Thru with Love" (later recorded by Alesha Dixon). "Here We Go" was due to be released as a single in June 2000, but the release fell through. The song later became the basis for the theme tune to the hit cartoon series Totally Spies! in 2001. The deal with London Records and Xenomania ultimately fell through.

2001–present: songwriting and musical theatre
Following the demise of their deal with London Records, Cooper and Higgins began writing and producing for other artists. Cooper has been described as the "chief lyricist" of Xenomania, who are based out of a converted mansion in Kent. Cooper co-wrote the lyrics for the song "Round Round" which became a number one hit for the Sugababes in 2002. Xenomania continued their commercial breakthrough by writing "Sound of the Underground" for Popstars: The Rivals winners Girls Aloud; the song spent four consecutive weeks at number one.

Since 2002, Xenomania have been recurring collaborators of Girls Aloud. Miranda Cooper co-wrote all of Girls Aloud's original singles up until their hiatus in 2009, including the BRIT Award-winning number one "The Promise". Cooper also co-wrote another number one single for the Sugbabes, 2003's "Hole in the Head", as well as the singles "In the Middle" and "Red Dress". In 2011, Cooper worked with girl group The Saturdays, co-penning the single "All Fired Up", and boy band The Wanted. Cooper has also co-written songs for prestigious artists such as Kylie Minogue and Pet Shop Boys, including the singles "Giving You Up" and "Love Etc." Xenomania have also helped launch the careers of The X Factor contestant Amelia Lily and Australian singer-songwriter Gabriella Cilmi.

In May 2018, a stage musical adaptation of the film Son of Rambow was workshopped at The Other Palace in London which featured lyrics by Cooper (with previous writing partner Nick Coler and writer Richard Marsh). Cooper and Coler also wrote the musical adaptation of David Walliams' book Billionaire Boy which will premiere at the Nuffield Theatre, Southampton (City theatre) for Christmas 2018.

References

1975 births
Living people
People from Kent
English women pop singers
English songwriters
English female dancers
English record producers
Xenomania
British women record producers